Naomi Heaton (married name Waxman; née Jarrett) is Group Chairman and owner of UK real estate investment advisory London Central Portfolio Limited (LCP) and associated companies, LCP Corp, LCP Capital Investments, LCP HQ and LCP Hospitality Holdings. Dubbed "property queen" by the London Evening Standard, Naomi set up one of the first buying agents in the UK and was a pioneer of residential property funds targeting central London's rental sector, including the UK's first sharia-compliant residential fund. In December 2019, LCP Hospitality Holdings entered a joint venture partnership with APG, the Dutch Pension Provider, to establish The Portfolio Club with the purpose of launching a new hospitality brand, initially in central London. Called The Other House, Naomi is co-founder and Chief Executive.

Early career 
Naomi Heaton joined advertising agency Leo Burnett after graduating from Oxford University in 1977 with an MA(Hons) in Human Sciences. After moving to Saatchi & Saatchi in 1982 she became a board director in 1984. A further move to Young & Rubicam saw her appointed as main board director from 1985–1986.

Founding London Central Portfolio and the LCP group of companies 
Naomi bought her first property—a garden flat in Camden Town—at age 26 and began buying, renovating and selling property on for profit as a hobby while pursuing her advertising career. Ready for a new challenge and recognising a gap in the market for assisting investors like herself in the London real estate market, Naomi established London Central Portfolio (LCP) in 1989 to provide a full asset management service including property finding, refurbishment and lettings. Naomi is owner and chairman, as well as holding directorships on further LCP group companies established in 2013–2014 and 2019 together with a number of listed property funds.

Establishing The Portfolio Club and The Other House 
Naomi established LCP Hospitality Holdings in 2019 to enter a joint venture with APG, the largest pension provider in the Netherlands with €587 billion in assets under management (May 2021). APG is an active investor in the hotel sector. It has invested in the citizenM hotels and has recently increased its investment in a number of leading European hotels. 

The resulting joint venture partnership, The Portfolio Club (TPC), is developing a lifestyle brand known as The Other House, establishing a new sector of ‘Residents Clubs’ offering flexible stay accommodation with access to hotel style services on demand through a bespoke app.

To date The Portfolio Club has acquired two assets. The first acquisition in December 2019 was a hotel known as Harrington Hall in South Kensington. The second acquisition in October 2020 was The Wellington Block in Covent Garden, acquired from Capco Holdings for £76.5m.

The Other House showcases the best in British design, utilising green technologies, focussing on sustainability and positive social and environmental impact.

Other activities 
Naomi is considered a property investment expert and has appeared on international media including BBC Radio 4's Today Programme, BBC Radio 5 Live, Sky News and Reuters. In 2017 she was named as one of London's top 50 CEOs by Citywealth, as London's top buying agent by Spear's, and as one of Debrett's people of today. She regularly speaks at real estate and finance conferences and since the launch of The Other House, hospitality events including Hotel Designs Live and Hospitality Leadership Design Conference.

Naomi is married to Jonathan Waxman, Professor of Oncology at Imperial College, founder and lifetime president of Prostate Cancer, the UK’s largest male healthcare charity, and author of around 400 scientific research papers and chapters, 11 books on cancer, a law book, a novel and two collections of short stories. Their home, a Nash stucco terrace near Regent's Park, has been featured in the London Evening Standard, Homes & Antiques Magazine, and The London Magazine; Naomi’s interiors expertise has also appeared in the London Evening Standard.

See also 
London Central Portfolio Limited

References 

Year of birth missing (living people)
Living people
Alumni of the University of Oxford
British women in business